The Framingham State Rams are composed of 14 varsity teams (6 men's, 8 women's) representing Framingham State University in intercollegiate athletics. All teams compete at the NCAA Division III level and all teams compete in the Massachusetts State Collegiate Athletic Conference (MASCAC), except for field hockey, which plays in the Little East Conference (LEC).

Background
Men's programs include baseball, cross country, football, basketball, ice hockey, and soccer. Women's programs include cross country, lacrosse, softball, basketball, field hockey, outdoor track and field, soccer, and volleyball. Club sports that the university offers include Cheerleading, Men's Lacrosse, Men's Rugby, and Women's Rugby. The university also offers a wide variety of intramural programs that include everything from badminton, to golf, to dodgeball. There is also a state-of-the-art athletic and recreation center which opened in 2001 that includes basketball courts, a volleyball court, and a weight room.

In 2007, the women's soccer team was awarded the NCAA Sportsmanship Award.

Nickname 
Framingham State University adopted its mascot the ram in 1967, after a school-wide vote on what should represent the school. It came at the same time as the school, which had been all female up until 1964, added its first male athletics team. In one of the logos it shows a ram running down a hill, which represents the 282 foot (86 meter) high Bare Hill, where Framingham State University sits atop. The mascot's name is Sam the Ram.

Sports sponsored

NCAA Division III Sports

Club Sports

Baseball 
The Framingham State Rams baseball team’s home field is Bowditch Field in Framingham, Massachusetts, however most early season home games are played at the New England Baseball Complex (NEBC) in Northborough, Massachusetts.

Accomplishments
 Massachusetts State Collegiate Athletic Conference (MASCAC) Tournament Runner Up – 2017, 2018
Eastern College Athletic Conference (ECAC) Division III New England Baseball Tournament Runner Up – 1993, 1997, 2015

Men's basketball 
Accomplishments
MASCAC Regular Season Champions – 1978–79, 1979–80, 1983–84 
MASCAC Tournament Runner Up – 2000–01, 2001–02, 2004–05
 NCAA Division III men's basketball tournament Qualifier – 1978–79, 1979–80, 1983–84
 NCAA Division III men's basketball tournament Regional Second Place Team – 1978–79

Women's basketball 
Accomplishments
 MASCAC Regular Season Champions – 2013–14, 2019–20, 2021–22 
MASCAC Tournament Runner Up – 2013–14, 2015–16, 2016–17, 2017–18
MASCAC Tournament Champions – 2019–20, 2021–22

Men's cross country 
Accomplishments
 Yankee Small College Conference NECA Tournament Champions – 2011

Women's cross country 
Accomplishments
 Yankee Small College Conference NECA Tournament Champions – 2011

Football 

In 1972 the football team played its first game.

In 1978 the football team played its first home game.

The Framingham State Rams football program has seen several successful seasons in recent years. The Rams won the Massachusetts State College Athletic Conference (MASCAC) regular season championship four straight years (2010, 2011, 2012, 2013). In 2011, 2012, and 2013 the team also took the title as New England Football Conference (NEFC (now Commonwealth Coast Football)) Bogan Division champions, and outright champions in 2012. In 2010, the program won its first Eastern College Athletic Conference (ECAC) Northeast Bowl. The Rams participated in the 2013 NCAA Division III Football Championship, losing to SUNY Cortland in the first-round. In 2014 the Rams were MASCAC Champions & ECAC North Atlantic Bowl Champions winning against RPI 42–36 in Overtime. In 2015 the Rams were MASCAC Champions and participated in the 2015 NCAA Division III Football Championship, losing to Wesley College 42–22. In 2016 the Rams won the New England Bowl v.s. Salve Regina winning 37–34. In 2017 the Rams were MASCAC co-champions and won the 2017 New England Bowl Series against Curry College 48–14. In 2018 the rams were MASCAC Champions and participated in the 2018 NCAA Division III Football Championship losing to Brockport State in the first round 40–27. In 2019 the Rams were MASCAC Champions and participants in the 2019 Division III Football Championship losing to Wesley College in first round 58–21. In 2021 the Rams went 8–2 (8–0 in MASCAC play) in the regular season and were MASCAC Champions along with being participants in the 2021 Division III Football Championship. However the Rams lost to Muhlenberg College in the first round 45–0.

Head coach Thomas (Tom) Kelley '76 coached the Framingham State Rams football team for 2 years as head coach in his first stint from 1982–1984. He later returned to the rams football program as head coach for 13 years from 2007 until 2020 going 107–59–1 (.643) in his second head coaching stint. In his second stint he won 9 MASCAC regular season championships, won 4 bowl games, and took the rams to 5 NCAA Division III Football Championship appearances. He currently serves as the athletic director at Framingham State University.

On April 30, 2022, the Seattle Seahawks of the National Football League (NFL) signed defensive end Joshua Onujiogu as an undrafted free agent. 

Accomplishments

 MASCAC Regular Season Champions – 2010, 2011, 2012, 2013, 2014, 2015, 2017, 2018, 2019, 2021 
New England Football Conference (NEFC) League Champions – 2011, 2012
NCAA Division III Football Championship Qualifier – 2012, 2013, 2015, 2018, 2019, 2021
 ECAC Northeast Bowl Champions – 2010
 ECAC North Atlantic Bowl Champions – 2014
New England Bowl Champions – 2016, 2017

Field hockey 
Accomplishments

 MASCAC Regular Season Champions – 2004, 2007 
 Little East Conference (LEC) Champions – 2009

Men's ice hockey 
On February 26, 2022, the 7th seeded Framingham State Rams (3–21–1 overall, 1–16–1 in MASCAC play) upset the 2nd seeded Fitchburg State Falcons (17–6–1 overall, 14–3–1 in MASCAC play) at the Wallace Civic Center in Fitchburg, Massachusetts, on a 1–0 overtime win in the MASCAC Men's Hockey Tournament quarterfinal game with the overtime game winning goal scored by freshman forward Kaleb Kinskey on a power play goal.  It was the Rams first MASCAC Men's Hockey tournament win since 2014, although they subsequently lost 8–4 to the 1st seeded Plymouth State Panthers (19–6–2 overall, 14–2–2 in MASCAC play) in the MASCAC tournament semifinals 3 days later on March 1, 2022. 

Accomplishments

 ECAC Division III Champions – 1979

Women's lacrosse 
On May 7, 2022, the 2nd seeded Framingham State Rams (11–7 overall, 6–1 MASCAC play) won their first ever MASCAC tournament championship at home against the 4th seeded Bridgewater State Bears (10–9 overall, 4–3 MASCAC play) by a score of 18–10, led by first-year head coach Devyne Doran, and MASCAC tournament MVP, sophomore midfielder Rachel Erickson. 

Accomplishments

 MASCAC Regular Season Champions – 2019, 2021 
 MASCAC Tournament Champions – 2022 
MASCAC Tournament Runner Up – 2018, 2019, 2021
NCAA Division III Women's Lacrosse Championship Qualifier – 2022
 New England Women's Lacrosse Alliance Team Sportsmanship Award – 2011

Men's soccer 
Accomplishments

 MASCAC Regular Season Champions – 2007, 2008, 2011, 2012, 2018, 2019, 2022 
 MASCAC Tournament Champions – 2008, 2011, 2019 
MASCAC Tournament Runner Up – 2015, 2018, 2021
NCAA Division III Men's Soccer Championship Qualifier – 2008, 2011, 2019

Women's soccer 
Accomplishments
 MASCAC Regular Season Champions – 1999, 2000, 2001, 2002, 2003, 2004, 2013 
 MASCAC Tournament Champions – 2000, 2001 
 ECAC Division III New England Women's Soccer Champions – 2014
NCAA Division III Women's Soccer Championship Qualifier – 1999, 2000, 2001
 NCAA Sportsmanship Award – 2007 (for 2006 team) 
 Massachusetts Association For Intercollegiate Athletics For Women (MAIAW) Champions – 1998
National Association of Collegiate Directors of Athletics (NACDA) Conference Champions – 1999–2000, 2000–01, 2001–02

Softball 
Accomplishments

 MASCAC Regular Season Champions – 2017, 2019, 2021 
 MASCAC Tournament Champions – 2007, 2017, 2018, 2019, 2022 
 MASCAC Tournament Runner Up – 2004, 2006, 2021
NCAA Division III Softball Championship Qualifier – 2007, 2017, 2018, 2019, 2022

Women's volleyball 
Accomplishments

 MASCAC Regular Season Champions – 1991, 1992, 2012, 2014, 2015, 2016, 2022 
MASCAC Tournament Runner Up – 2005, 2013, 2017, 2019
 MASCAC Tournament Champions – 2012, 2014, 2015, 2016, 2021 
NCAA Division III women's volleyball tournament Qualifier – 2012, 2014, 2015, 2016, 2021
Massachusetts State Colleges Women's Volleyball Champions – 1972–73

Facilities 
All teams compete on campus at the Athletic and Recreation Center (Richard C. Logan Gymnasium) for indoor sports and Maple Street Field for outdoor sports, except for the baseball and football teams who play off-campus at Bowditch Field in Framingham, and the men's ice hockey team who skates at the Loring Arena (also off-campus) also in Framingham.

 Athletic and Recreation Center and the Richard C. Logan Gymnasium – Located on the southeastern end of the main campus of Framingham State University, attached to Dwight Hall, the Athletic and Recreation Center opened in November, 2001 and is home to the men's and women's basketball teams and the women's volleyball team in the Richard C. Logan Gymnasium on the bottom floor. Built at a cost of $12 million the facility features two full-length basketball courts, a volleyball court and seating for 1,000 spectators at home volleyball and basketball games. The second floor of the Athletic and Recreation Center houses a weight room equipped with nautilus machines, cardiovascular equipment, and free weights, as well as two all-purpose rooms which are used for aerobics and dance classes. The Richard C. Logan '70 Gymnasium was dedicated on April 9, 2022, which honors one of the first male students to attend Framingham State University and currently serving as both Chair and Vice Chair of the Board of Trustees at Framingham State University, Richard "Dick" Logan '70.
 Maple Street Field – Located around a half a mile (0.8 km) southwest from the main campus of Framingham State University on 220 Maple Street, Framingham, Massachusetts, the Maple Street Field is home to the men's and women's soccer teams, the women's lacrosse team the club men's lacrosse team, the field hockey team, and the softball team. Maple Street Field is owned and operated by Framingham State University and in the summer of 2014 the Maple Street Field underwent a $4.5 million renovation and the project updated the existing game field, added a second multi-sport softball/practice turf field, lights, two scoreboards (one for each field), and the construction of an auxiliary athletics building. The auxiliary athletics building which is located between the two fields provides heated bathrooms for athletes and spectators, team rooms for the participating teams, as well as a ticket booth, and concessions area.
Game Field (Turf) – Home to the men's and women's soccer teams, the women's lacrosse team, the club men's lacrosse team, and the field hockey team the game field located on the west end of the complex, features a 4-lane track, goal posts for football practice, goals for field hockey, lacrosse, and soccer, bleachers with a seating capacity of 900, a fully enclosed two-tiered press box, and a turf field with lines for football, lacrosse, soccer, and field hockey. In addition, the existing game field was outfitted with lights to allow for games and practices to be held at night. The bleachers, the press box, the turf field, the scoreboard, and the lights were added as a part of the $4.5 million renovation in summer of 2014.
Softball/Practice Field (Turf) – Home to the softball team, the new multi-sport turf field, located on the east end of the complex, opened in summer of 2014 has a softball field and a practice field on it. The softball/practice field has a multi-sport scoreboard, lights for night games, covered dugouts, as well as a bullpen area beyond the left field fence. When the portable 6 foot fence is in place for softball in spring, the dimensions are 200 ft (61 meters). down the lines and 220 ft (67 meters). to center field. When the fence for softball is not in place after spring, the turf has space for a regulation football field which is mainly used for practice by softball and other sports teams.
 Bowditch Field – Located on 475 Union Avenue, Framingham, Massachusetts, around a mile (1.61 km) southeast away from the main campus of Framingham State University, Bowditch Field is home to the football and baseball teams. The complex is owned by the City of Framingham and operated by the City of Framingham Division of Parks and Recreation and Cultural Affairs. Bowditch Field also serves as the headquarters for the City of Framingham Division of Parks and Recreation and Cultural Affairs. Bowditch Field opened in the 1930s as a Works Progress Administration project during the Great Depression, and is home to a natural-grass football field, a natural-grass baseball field, 4 tennis courts, 2 basketball courts and a track and field practice area.
Football Field (Grass) – Located on the south end of the complex, the football field features a natural-grass playing surface, with a 6-lane track, and modern stands capable of accommodating 3,500-5,300+ spectators. The original 1930s bleachers along with the entire stadium were replaced and renovated in 2010. The stadium features a press box, a scoreboard, and lights for night games.
William D. Carey Baseball Field (Grass) – Located on the north end of the complex, the baseball field is an NCAA regulation sized natural-grass baseball field with dimensions of 346 ft (105.5 meters) to left field, 364 ft (111 meters) to center field, and 305 ft (93 meters) to right field.  The field features a scoreboard and lights for night games.
 Edward F. Loring Ice Arena – Located on 165 Fountain Street, Framingham, Massachusetts, around 2 miles (3.22 km) south away from the main campus of Framingham State University, Loring Arena is home to the men's ice hockey team. The arena is a City of Framingham owned skating facility, operated by the City of Framingham Division of Parks Recreation and Cultural Affairs. Loring Arena opened in November 1963 as a seasonally operated facility, and one of the first municipally owned arenas in the area. Loring Arena underwent a complete renovation beginning in May 2017. The $6 million renovation and expansion project was completed in the fall of 2018 and included a dedicated locker room and storage space for the FSU ice hockey program.

Bowditch Field and Loring Arena are used not only by the Framingham State Rams baseball, football, and men's ice hockey teams respectively but the Framingham High School Flyers for their baseball, football and men's/women's ice hockey teams as well respectively.

In addition to playing their home games at Bowditch Field the Framingham State Rams baseball team also play their early season home games at the New England Baseball Complex in Northborough, Massachusetts, around 12 miles (19.3 km) away.

Note: men's and women's cross country along with women's outdoor track and field do not have a home course or a home track (no home meets) respectively as of spring 2023.

References

External links 
 https://www.fsurams.com/landing/index

Sports teams in Massachusetts
NCAA Division III
Framingham State University
Massachusetts State Collegiate Athletic Conference
Little East Conference